Michel Dagbert (born 28 January 1962 in Barlin, Pas-de-Calais) is a French politician. He is the President of the General Council of the Pas-de-Calais department, and is a member of the Socialist Party. He was the Mayor of Barlin from 2002 to 2014.

References

1962 births
Living people
Senators of Pas-de-Calais
Socialist Party (France) politicians
21st-century French politicians
French general councillors